The Worth of a Man is a 1912 American dramatic silent film directed by J. Farrell MacDonald. It was produced by the Independent Moving Pictures (IMP) Company of New York.

References

External links
 

1912 films
American silent short films
American black-and-white films
1912 short films
Films about disability
Films directed by J. Farrell MacDonald
Medical-themed films
Silent American drama films
1912 drama films
1910s American films